Phillip H. McArthur is a folklorist and anthropologist. His work in the Marshall Islands closely examines social power and indigenous epistemologies with special attention to the tumultuous relationship with the United States. Dr. McArthur has spent much of his career documenting and analyzing Marshall Islander narratives, mythology, songs, performances, etc.

Research 
Dr. McArthur's research emphasizes social theoretical and semiotic approaches to traditional narrative (i.e. myth, oral history), cultural performance (ritual, ceremony, festival, spectacle), history, cosmology, and local cultures within the contexts of decolonization, nationalism and globalization.  This includes a deepening attention to political and economic forces, and their relationship to social power and practice. With a geographical specialization in Oceania, he additionally includes comparative studies on cultures of Asia, Native America, Africa and the Classical world. He also integrates deep interests in comparative philosophy, the history of ideas, dialogic ethnography, and traditional arts.

His teaching represents a wide range of topics centered in theory, cultural studies, and expressive culture. Students of Phillip McArthur have noted that in each course he seeks to fuse anthropological perspectives with humanistic inquiry. While Oceania provides one geographical focus, his research and teaching philosophy seeks to bring to bear a comparative perspective into the classroom through exposure to a range of cross-cultural materials. He continues to develop curriculum in Anthropology and Cultural Sustainability, Pacific Islands Studies, and Integrated Humanities that engages students to think about culture in critical and thought-provoking ways. In this way, students learn to develop culture sensitivity and insight to function productively within academics, the private sector, government, and the community.

Critical Thinking Pedigree 
Phillip McArthur studied under the renowned folklorists and scholars Richard Bauman and Beverly J. Stoeltje.  Currently Phillip McArthur teaches courses on Anthropology Theory and Method, Narrative, Mythology, Political and Economic Anthropology, Ethnographic Methods, Cultures of Oceania, and Histories of Oceania at Brigham Young University-Hawaii.

Publications 
Representative Publications:
Dialogues with a Trickster: On the Margins of Myth and Ethnography in the Marshall Islands.  2024 book manuscript in production.  University of Hawai'i Press.
"The Church in the Marshall Islands: A Cultural History". In "Battlefields to Temple Grounds: Latter-day Saints in Guam and Micronesia" 2023. R. Devan Jensen and Rosalind Ram, eds. Religious Studies Center, BYU.  pp. 67-100.
"Oceania."  In A Companion to Folklore 2012.  Regina Bendix and Galit Hasan-Rokem, eds.  Wiley-Blackwell Press.  pp. 248–264.
"Ambivalent Fantasies:  Local Prehistories and Global Dramas in the Marshall Islands" 2008. Journal of Folklore Research 45(3): 263-298.
"Modernism and Pacific Ways at Knowing: An Uneasy Dialogue in Micronesia." 2007. Pacific Rim Studies 1(1):7-24
Introductory Note "Folklore, Nationalism, and the Challenge of the Future", in The Marrow of Human Experience: Essays in Folklore, William Wilson. Ed. Jill Terry Rudy. Logan: Utah State University Press. 2006
"Narrative, Cosmos, and Nation: Intertextuality and Power in the Marshall Islands". 2004. Journal of American Folklore 462: 1.
"Oceania: An Overview". In CultureGrams: World Addition, Vol. IV (Asia and Oceania). 2002. Lindon: Axiom Press.
"Narrating to the Center of Power in the Marshall Islands". 2000. In We are a People: Narrative and Multiplicity in the Construction of Ethnic Identity. Philadelphia: Temple University Press. Paul Spickard and W. Jeffrey Burroughs, eds.
"More Than Meets the Ear: A Marshallese Example of Folklore Method and Study for Pacific Collections". 1997. PIALA: Identifying, Using and Sharing Local Resources. pp. 49–71. University of Guam.

Associations 
Professor, Cultural Anthropology and Integrated Humanities
Affiliated Faculty, Jonathan Napela Center for Hawaiian and Pacific Islands Studies
Editor-in-Chief, Pacific Studies and Napela Center Publications

Education 
Ph. D. Folklore Studies (Cultural Anthropology, Performance Studies/Semiotics) Indiana University
M.A. Folklore Studies Indiana University
B.A. Anthropology Brigham Young University
A.A.S Psychology Ricks College

External links 
The Pacific Institute
The American Folklore Society
BYU-Hawaii
Indiana University
Indiana University, Folklore Dept.

Notes and references 

American anthropologists
Folklorists
American folklorists
Indiana University alumni
Brigham Young University–Hawaii faculty
Brigham Young University alumni
Brigham Young University–Idaho alumni
Living people
Year of birth missing (living people)